The S. Cornelia Young Memorial Library (also known as the Cornelia Young Memorial Library or "Old Corny") is a historic library in Daytona Beach, Florida, United States. It was added to the National Register of Historic Places in 1992.

The S. Cornelia Young Memorial Library closed to the public in spring of 2010 due to budget cutbacks. It was a branch of the Volusia County Public Libraries.

References

External links

 Volusia County listings at National Register of Historic Places
 Florida's Office of Cultural and Historical Programs
 Volusia County listings
 S. Cornelia Young Memorial Library

Libraries in Florida
National Register of Historic Places in Volusia County, Florida
Education in Volusia County, Florida
Buildings and structures in Daytona Beach, Florida